My Husband's Getting Married is a 1913 Hungarian film directed by Michael Curtiz.

Plot summary

Cast
 Gerö Mály as budai füszeres (as Mály Gerõ)
 Adél Marosi as Katalin, Zsemle felesége
 Lili Hajnóczy as özv. Merengõné
 Gyula Szöreghy as Jávorka, kishivatalnok
 József Sándor as Törvényszéki díjnok
 Lajos Gellért as Grünhut házügynök
 Vilmos Sáfrány as Törvényszéki díjnok

References

External links
 
 

1913 films
Films directed by Michael Curtiz
Hungarian silent films
Hungarian black-and-white films
Austro-Hungarian films